What a Woman Wants to Hear is the debut album of American country music singer Dawn Sears. It was released in 1991 via Warner Bros. Records. The tracks "Till You Come Back to Me" and "Good Goodbye" were released as singles.

Critical reception
Giving it a "B+", Alanna Nash of Entertainment Weekly praised Sears' "emotive" voice, comparing her favorably to Reba McEntire and Shelby Lynne. She also wrote that the album contained a "solid repertoire".

Michael McCall of AllMusic writes, "Her powerful debut, produced by Barry Beckett, it reveals her ability with a forceful country rocker ("Good Goodbye") as well as a touching ballad ("Till You Come Back to Me.")"

Track listing

Personnel
Compiled from liner notes.
Musicians
Eddie Bayers — drums
Barry Beckett — keyboards
Paul Franklin — steel guitar
Sonny Garrish — steel guitar
Steve Gibson — electric guitar
Dann Huff — electric guitar
Mitch Humphries — keyboards
Mike Lawler — keyboards
Danny Parks — electric guitar
Dave Pomeroy — bass guitar
Don Potter — acoustic guitar
Matt Rollings — keyboards
Brent Rowan — electric guitar
Dawn Sears — lead vocals, background vocals
Kenny Sears — fiddle
Jack Williams — bass guitar
Dennis Wilson — background vocals
Curtis Young — background vocals
Reggie Young — electric guitar

Technical
Barry Beckett — production
Pete Greene — recording, mixing
Justin Niebank — recording, mixing
Denny Purcell — mastering
Ragena Warren — production coordination

References

1991 debut albums
Albums produced by Barry Beckett
Dawn Sears albums
Warner Records albums